Tetraspanin-3 is a protein that in humans is encoded by the TSPAN3 gene.

The protein encoded by this gene is a member of the transmembrane 4 superfamily, also known as the tetraspanin family. Most of these members are cell-surface proteins that are characterized by the presence of four hydrophobic domains. 

The proteins mediate signal transduction events that play a role in the regulation of cell development, activation, growth and motility. The use of alternate polyadenylation sites has been found for this gene. Two alternative transcripts encoding different isoforms have been described.

References

Further reading

External links